Aquostic II – That's a Fact! is the thirty-second studio album by English rock band Status Quo, released on 21 October 2016. It is the last album to feature guitarist and vocalist Rick Parfitt prior to his death on 24 December 2016. Hannah Rickard, with whom Rossi collaborated on their common album "We Talk Too Much" in 2019, can be heard as violinist and background singer.

Prior to its release, Aquostic II was announced with the addition "One More for the Road", named after the new track and the ongoing tour.  It is their second acoustic album, following on from their Aquostic – Stripped Bare album from 2014, and features old Status Quo songs played acoustically along with the new songs "One for the Road" and "One of Everything". A third new track called "Is Somebody Rocking Your Heart" is part of the deluxe edition. A rearranged version of this song, written by Francis Rossi and Bob Young, reappeared as a duet between Bonnie Tyler and Rossi on the former's 2019 album Between The Earth And The Stars under the title "Someone's Rockin' Your Heart".

The two released singles "Hold You Back" and "That's a Fact" each consist of one track, they were only distributed for promotional uses.

Critical reception

Barney Harsent of The Arts Desk called the album "a fun addition" to the band's catalogue, highlighting "That's a Fact", "Roll Over Lay Down", "In the Army Now" and "Ice in the Sun" as songs that benefitted from the new arrangements, and said it was a reminder that "Status Quo are gifted masters of their craft. Simple songs they may be, but never simplistic".

Writing for Classic Rock, David Quantick stated that "the results are just as effective" as on the previous Aquostic album, and that they are "never less than delightful to the ear".

For Get Ready to Rock, David Wilson observed that "a myth has grown up around Quo that all songs sound the same and that their songs amount to the ABC of rock" but asserted that those who take the time to listen to their discography in depth will realise that "the band and music are a lot more complex than most people give them credit for". He concluded that the original Aquostic album "ably demonstrated there is a lot more to Status Quo than meets the ear" and that Aquostic II emphasises the same point.

Track listing

Personnel

Status Quo
Francis Rossi – guitars, vocals
Rick Parfitt – guitars, vocals
John "Rhino" Edwards – bass, guitar, vocals
Andy Bown – guitar, mandolin, harmonica, piano, vocals
Leon Cave – drums, guitar, vocals

Additional musicians
Geraint Watkins – accordion, melodica
Martin Ditcham – percussion

 Richard Benbow – string arrangements

Sophie Sirota – viola
Sarah Willson – cello

Production
Mike Paxman – producer, photography
Gregg Jackman – recording engineer, mixing
Martin Haskell – mastering engineer
Tanja Buck – assistant producer

Charts

References

2016 albums
Status Quo (band) albums
Albums produced by Mike Paxman